Azha may refer to:

 Eta Eridani or Azha, a star in the constellation Eridanus
 Tuyuhun or Azha, a former kingdom in China
 Azha language, a Sino-Tibetan language spoken by the Yi people of China

See also
 Acha (disambiguation)
 Azhar (disambiguation)